Sarah Gailey is an American author. Their alternate history novella River of Teeth was a finalist for the 2017 Nebula Award for Best Novella, the 2018 Hugo Award for Best Novella, and the 2018 Locus Award for Best Novella. In 2018, they also won the Hugo Award for Best Fan Writer.

Career

Gailey's fiction has been published in The Atlantic, Tor.com, and Fireside Magazine. Their non-fiction writing has appeared on Tor.com, Mashable, The Boston Globe and Uncanny Magazine.

Gailey first became well-known for their 2017 American Hippo duology, consisting of the novellas River of Teeth and Taste of Marrow.

Their first full-length novel, Magic for Liars, was published by Tor Books in June 2019. Buzzfeed News called it "one of the best fantasies of 2019."

February 2020 brought the publication of a standalone novella, Upright Woman Wanted. Their debut young adult novel, When We Were Magic, was published by Simon Pulse in March 2020.

Gailey's second novel for adults, The Echo Wife, was published in February 2021 by Tor Books. In August 2021, their five-issue original comics series Eat the Rich premiered.

In 2022 Gailey released their third novel for adults, Just Like Home, published in July by Tor Books. They continued their work in comics with a 12-issue Buffy the Vampire Slayer comics arc titled The Vampire Slayer (2022-2023) and an original science fiction series titled Know Your Station (2022-2023), co-created with artist Liana Kangas.

Personal life
Gailey is originally from the San Francisco Bay Area, and as of 2019 lives in Los Angeles with their partner.

Gailey is non-binary.

Bibliography

Novels
 Magic for Liars (2019, Tor Books)
 When We Were Magic (2020, Simon Pulse)
 The Echo Wife (2021, Tor Books)
 Just Like Home (2022, Tor Books)

Comics Collections
 Eat the Rich (2022, BOOM! Studios)
 The Vampire Slayer, Vol. 1 (2023, BOOM! Studios )
 The Vampire Slayer, Vol. 2 (2023, BOOM! Studios)
 The Vampire Slayer, Vol. 3 (2023, BOOM! Studios)
 Know Your Station (2023, BOOM! Studios)

Novellas

 River of Teeth (2017, Tor Books)
 Taste of Marrow (2017, Tor Books)
 The Fisher of Bones (2017, Fireside Fiction)
 Upright Women Wanted (2020, Tor Books)

American Hippo series

 American Hippo (2018, Tor Books; ; omnibus containing the novellas River of Teeth and Taste of Marrow, as well as additional short stories, including "Worth Her Weight in Gold")
 River of Teeth
 Taste of Marrow

Short stories

Select nonfiction
 "This Future Looks Familiar: Watching Blade Runner in 2017". Tor.com October 2017.
 "Impostor/Abuser: Power Dynamics in Publishing". Fireside Magazine March 2019.

Awards and nominations
 2017 John W. Campbell Award for Best New Writer finalist
 2017 Hugo Award for Best Related Work nomination for "The Women of Harry Potter" posts
 2017 British Fantasy Award Best Non-fiction nomination for "The Women of Harry Potter" posts 
 2017 Nebula nomination for River of Teeth
 2018 Hugo and Locus nominations for River of Teeth
 2018 Hugo Award for Best Fan Writer
 2019 Hugo and Locus nominations for "STET"
 2020 Hugo nomination for "Away With The Wolves" 
 2020 Locus Award nomination for Magic for Liars
 2021 Hugo nomination and 2021 Locus Award nominations for Upright Women Wanted

References

External links 
 Official website

Living people
21st-century American novelists
American LGBT novelists
Non-binary novelists
LGBT people from California
People from Los Angeles
Writers from Oakland, California
Year of birth missing (living people)
Hugo Award-winning fan writers
LGBT people from the San Francisco Bay Area
American non-binary writers